Apollodorus of Damascus was a Damascus-born Greek architect and engineer from Roman Syria, who flourished during the 2nd century AD. As an engineer he authored several technical treatises, and his massive architectural output gained him immense popularity during his time. He is one of the few architects whose name survives from antiquity, and is credited with introducing several Eastern innovations to the Roman Imperial style, such as making the dome a standard.

Early life
Apollodorus was born in Damascus, Roman Syria. All sources indicate that Apollodorus of Damascus was ethnically Greek, and was indeed of Greek heritage. Little is known of his early life, but he started his career as a military engineer before meeting future emperor Trajan in Damascus, then being summoned to Rome by him when he was a consul in 91 AD, after his twentieth birthday, and later accompanying him during the Second Dacian War in 105 AD.

Work
Apollodorus was Trajan's favored architect and engineer. He designed and oversaw the construction of the Forum, Markets, and Temple, and Column of Trajan (the first monument of its kind), and the Stadium of Domitian within the city of Rome. Outside the capital, Apollodorus built bridges across the Danube and the Tagus in Spain and designed the triumphal arches of Trajan at Benevento and Ancona.  He is the author of Siege Engines (Πολιορκητικά), dedicated to an unnamed emperor, likely Trajan.

Style
Fiorella Festa Farina, Director of the Italian Institute of Culture in Damascus, described the technical prowess of Apollodorus as stemming from his cultural roots and the architectural tradition of Syria, owing his mastery to "Nabataean culture filtered through Greek modes of thought." He was known for his practical and robust designs. It was likely due to his influence that domes became a standard element in Roman architecture.

Death
Cassius Dio reports that Apollodorus offended Hadrian by dismissing and ridiculing the emperor's forays into architecture, which led to his banishment and death (although doubts have been raised concerning the veracity of Dio's claim).

In literature

Apollodorus of Damascus plays an important role in the later part of the historical novel Empire by Steven Saylor. The (fictional) protagonist Marcus Pinarius, a talented young sculptor and architect, becomes Apollodorus' protege, accompanies him during the war in Dacia and on various building projects in Rome, and later marries Apollodorus' daughter. After Apollodorus' banishment, Pinarius takes his place as the favorite architect of Hadrian. While all that is fictional, the book follows the known facts of Apollodorus' life (and accepts the account of his death at Hadrian's hands).

See also 
 Trajan's Market
 Trajan's Column
 Temple of Trajan
 Trajan's Bridge
 Trajan's Forum
 Pantheon, Rome

Notes

References 
 
 
 James Grout: 'Apollodorus of Damascus,' part of the Encyclopædia Romana
 Cassius Dio 'Roman History' 69.3,4

External links 

 * 

Ancient Roman architects
Bridge engineers
People from Damascus
2nd-century Romans
2nd-century Greek people
Ancient Roman exiles
People executed by the Roman Empire
2nd-century architects